The 2015–16 Coppin State Eagles men's basketball team represented Coppin State University during the 2015–16 NCAA Division I men's basketball season. The Eagles, led by second year head coach Michael Grant, played their home games at the Physical Education Complex and were members of the Mid-Eastern Athletic Conference. They finished the season 9–22, 6–10 in MEAC play to finish in a three way tie for ninth place. They defeated North Carolina A&T in the first round of the MEAC tournament to advance to the quarterfinals where they lost to South Carolina State.

Roster

Schedule

|-
!colspan=9 style="background:#333399; color:#CFB53B;"| Regular season

|-
!colspan=9 style="background:#333399; color:#CFB53B;"| MEAC tournament

References

Coppin State Eagles men's basketball seasons
Coppin State
Coppin State Eagles men's basketball team
Coppin State Eagles men's basketball team